Kevin Andrés Mantilla Camargo (born 22 May 2003) is a Colombian professional footballer who plays as a centre-back for Categoría Primera A club Santa Fe.

Club career

Santa Fe
While at Santa Fe, Mantilla briefly played alongside Francisco Meza, who he cited as a reference for his style of play. Following his impressive performances at the 2023 South American U-20 Championship, Mantilla was linked with a move to English Premier League side Liverpool.

International career

Youth
Mantilla has represented Colombia at under-20 level.

Career statistics

Club

References

2003 births
Living people
Footballers from Bogotá
Colombian footballers
Colombia youth international footballers
Association football defenders
Categoría Primera A players
Independiente Santa Fe footballers